Manda Airport , also called Lamu Airport, is an airport in Kenya.

Location
Manda Airport is located on Manda Island in the Lamu Archipelago of Lamu County on the western shore of the Indian Ocean, on the Kenya coast.

The geographic coordinates of this airport are: 2° 14' 46.00"S, 40° 54' 36.00"E (Latitude: -2.246110; Longitude: 40.910000).

Overview
Manda Airport is a small civilian airport on Manda Island, serving the Lamu Archipelago in Kenya.

Airlines and destinations

Accidents and incidents
Soon after becoming airborne, the aircraft lost height, crash-landed in Nairobi National Park and overturned. The pilot sustained minor injuries. The aircraft was written off.

The airport is near the Camp Simba US naval base. Al-Shabaab militants attacked the base in January 2020. The airport was temporarily closed.

See also
 Kenya Airports Authority
 Kenya Civil Aviation Authority
 List of airports in Kenya

References

External links
 Location of Manda Airport At Google Maps
  Website of Kenya Airports Authority
 List of Airports In Kenya

 Kenya Airports Authority – Manda Airstrip
 

Airports in Kenya
Lamu County